Alcanadre is a town and municipality in La Rioja province in northern Spain. The town is located along the Ebro River, between Logroño and Calahorra. Alcanadre has a temperate, Mediterranean climate. Its major agricultural products are wine, olive oil, almonds, and grain. The town is home to the shrine of Saint Aradón, ruins of a Roman aqueduct from the 1st century and the church of Santa María de la Asunción.

References

Municipalities in La Rioja (Spain)